Tilli Antonelli (Attilio Antonelli; born Russi, 27 September 1955) is an Italian entrepreneur and yacht manufacturer.

In 1981 he founded Cantiere Navale dell'Adriatico, located in the nautical business cluster of Marche, region of Italy.

In 1985 he founded both the shipyard and the brand Pershing who become part of Ferretti Group in 1998.

He was president of Itama from 2004 until 2009.

In 2010 he founded WIDER, a nautical company born as a spin-off yacht manufacturer, after he left his former position.

In May 2014 he was nominated member of UCINA's managing board.

Biography
As a youth he developed a strong passion for sailing and became a skipper. He took part in important sail boat Regattas and through this met the Italian entrepreneur Raul Gardini, connected with the world of sailing yachts who had pushed for Il Moro di Venezia, the Italian yacht challenger at the 1992 America's Cup.

In 1973 he became part of Raul Gardini's crew on a 45' yacht called "Naif", designed by Dick Carter, who was skipper and designer of Yachts that went on to win the '65 and '69 editions of the Fastnet Race, a 608-nautical mile offshore race between yachts that started on the coast of Great Britain in 1925 and takes its name from the Fastnet Rock located south-west of the coast of Ireland. In the same year Antonelli participated in the Admiral's Cup.

In February 1976 he left for Marblehead, at the request of Gardini to follow the construction of masts and sails for the first Il Moro di Venezia.

In 1977 he came back to Europe to take part for the first time in the Fastnet Race.

In 1978 he became a professional sailmaker, manufacturing and personally testing the sails at sea, and teaching yacht owners how to use them. He worked for two international sail makers in Liguria: Hood Sails in Sanremo and then in Rapallo for Horizon, that went on to become North Sails Italia.

In 1979 he took part in the ill-fated edition of the Fastnet Race, in which an unexpected storm lost one hundred and five vessels, resulting in the largest rescue operation to ever take place in peacetime until that moment.

In 1980 he returned to Ravenna, where he received an offer to work as Works Manager in a sailing boat manufacturer in Fano. Before accepting the offer he completed his racing commitments by competing in the World Championship selections, in the One Tonner Class.

Entrepreneurial beginnings
In June 1980 he moved to Fano and worked at the MSA Cantieri del Sole shipyard. After a few months of work Antonelli suggested to two co-workers that they open their own shipyard, found a client to finance him, and obtained a deposit of 20 million Lire to build a custom yacht. With that money the three founded Cantiere Navale dell'Adriatico in 1981.

In November of that year he met Stefania Vagnini and after one week of courtship asked her to become his wife. On 14 February 1982, Valentine's Day, he married Stefania, with whom he had three children, Camilla, Nicola and Ludovico. A few months later he launched his first vessel, a motorsailer.

During the sea trials of the yacht he stopped in the Isole Tremiti, where he met Lucio Dalla. The famous Italian singer-songwriter liked the yacht and he ordered one for himself with the name "Catarro", that become the second yacht produced by the shipyard.

Birth of Pershing
Together with the yacht designer Fulvio De Simoni, the idea was born to create a range of large sport cruisers (also known as Open Yachts) that would be comfortable, aggressive, and avant-garde. With this new philosophy the shipyard embarked upon an evolution that would lead to Pershing yachts (now a Ferretti Group brand), inspired by the United States army General John J. Pershing, a hero of the First World War.

In 1985 the first model was launched, the Pershing 45', one of the first performance open Boats to have three cabins and three heads. The vessel had one of the first hydraulic passarelles something that is found on every modern yacht today.

In 1992 the Pershing 70' was launched. It was the largest open yacht in composite material ever to be built at the time. One model was equipped with a 4000 hp gas turbine that allowed the vessel to reach speeds of 60 Knots. But one of the greatest styling features that later also became common in the automobile industry was the side windows framed by a fiberglass arch designed to allow the roof to slide back to a concealed position. This replaced the traditional metal frames.

In 2000 the shipyard reached another milestone in its fleet, the Pershing 88', that stood out from the crowd with its audacious metallic paintwork. The forward garage was also a first for yachting, housing a tender and a jet ski. In 2006 the model went out of production, becoming a collector's item of limited edition.

At the beginning of the 90s Pershing looked to new markets and expanded to the US, the Mediterranean Sea, and the Far East. In 1998 it became part of Ferretti Group, a world leading holding company in the yachting industry. Antonelli stayed on as President of the company.

In 2004 Antonelli was also made president of Itama, a brand that he managed together with Pershing until 2009.

In 2010, when the yachting industry was in major recession due to the global financial crisis, an investment fund offered to buy the Pershing brand, but Ferretti Group had no intention of selling, believing it to be of strategic importance to recover from the crisis. It was following this decision that on 3 March of that same year Antonelli resigned.

WIDER shipyard
One day in spring 2010 he returned home with an idea, met with his family around a sheet of paper, and on it he drew the overhead view of the hull of a yacht, then immediately after two wings that emerge from the central cockpit, doubling the dimensions of each side. He believed that it was time to reconsider the space available on a yacht with a view to offering greater comfort to owners.

A few months later he founded the WIDER shipyard, named to give a clear indication of the idea that started the project. 
On 14 April 2011, at the Porto Carlo Riva in Rapallo, the first model, named WIDER 42', was presented. 
The first yacht in the world with a cockpit that could extend laterally. It became necessary to find a name for a new category of yacht: "the WIDER cockpit".

In 2014 WIDER had two production facilities in Italy (in the region of Marche, in Ancona and Castelvecchio di Monte Porzio PU. The shipyard has an international coverage and develops avant-garde yacht projects. WIDER has made its corporate mission to continually push the boundaries of yachting.

Notes

External links
 WIDER YACHTS
 UCINA

1955 births
Italian businesspeople
Living people
Italian company founders